Syfy (formerly Sci-Fi) is a Spanish digital satellite/cable television channel that launched on June 1, 2006, and specializes in science fiction, fantasy, and horror shows and movies.

Owned by Universal Networks International, it is the fifth extension of the Syfy brand. The programming consists of a mixture of U.S. Syfy first-run shows like Haven and Defiance, current shows like Beauty & the Beast and archive shows such as Smallville and Charmed, as well as science-fiction and fantasy-themed movies, reality shows and scientific divulgation programs (Universo Syfy).

Current shows
 The 100
 Arrow
 Beauty & the Beast
 Being Human
 Dark Matter
 Dominion
 Defiance
 Fact or Faked: Paranormal Files
 Haven
 The Librarians

Archive shows currently on broadcast:
 Smallville
 Charmed

Past programs
 Alphas
 Andromeda
 American Gothic
 Babylon 5
 Battlestar Galactica
 Bionic Woman
 The Cape
 Caprica
 Dark Skies
 The Dead Zone
 Day Break
 Destination Truth
 Doctor Who
 Frank Herbert's Dune
 Earth 2
 Eureka
 Flash Gordon
 Hercules: The Legendary Journeys
 Heroes
 The Invisible Man
 Knight Rider
 Kyle XY
 Legend of the Seeker
 Lois & Clark: The New Adventures of Superman
 Quantum Leap
 Miracles
 Mysterious Ways
 Painkiller Jane
 Revolution
 Sanctuary
 The Secret Circle
 The Sentinel
 Seven Days
 Sliders
 Star Trek: Enterprise
 Stargate Atlantis
 Stargate SG-1
 Stargate Universe
 Tremors
 Tripping the Rift
 Xena: Warrior Princess
 Warehouse 13

Some of these shows where formerly shown by sister channel Calle 13.

References

External links
 
Sci Fi Expands to Spain
Sci Fi (Spain) at LyngSat Address

Syfy
Television stations in Spain
Science fiction television channels
Television channels and stations established in 2006
2006 establishments in Spain